Sagezabad Rural District is a rural district (dehestan) in the Central District of Buin Zahra County, Qazvin Province, Iran. At the 2006 census, its population was 5,672, in 1,461 families.  The rural district has 14 villages.

References 

Rural Districts of Qazvin Province
Buin Zahra County